Yenta or Yente is a Yiddish women's given name. It is a variant form of the name Yentl, which ultimately is thought to be derived from the Italian word gentile, meaning 'noble' or 'refined'. The name has entered Yinglish—i.e., become a Yiddish loanword in Jewish varieties of English—as a word referring to a woman who is a gossip or a busybody.

The use of yenta as a word for 'busybody' originated in the age of Yiddish theatre. During and after World War I, Yiddish-language discs recorded in New York by theatre actors such as Clara Gold and Gus Goldstein portrayed the characters Mendel and Yente Telebende and sold so well that dozens of copycat recordings were made. The popularity continued in the 1920s and 1930s as the humorist Jacob Adler, writing under the pen name B. Kovner for The Jewish Daily Forward, wrote a series of comic sketches featuring the characters, with Yente as a 'henpecking wife'. The popularity of the character led to the name developing its colloquial sense of 'a gossip'.

There is a mistaken belief that the word for a Jewish matchmaker is yenta or yente. In reality a Jewish matchmaker is called a shadchan (שדכן). The origin of this error is the 1964 musical Fiddler on the Roof, in which a character named Yente serves as the matchmaker for the village of Anatevka.

The name has also been used for:
 The Linux CardBus controller, which brings together Cardbus cards with the rest of the computer
 The name of a highly available key-value store for Perl

See also
 Yentl (disambiguation)
 Yente Serdatzky, Jewish-American Yiddish-language writer.

References

Yiddish words and phrases